A. G. Balakrishnan was an Indian politician and former Member of the Legislative Assembly of Tamil Nadu. He was elected to the Tamil Nadu legislative assembly from Vanur constituency as a Dravida Munnetra Kazhagam candidate in 1962, and 1967 elections.

References 

Dravida Munnetra Kazhagam politicians
Members of the Tamil Nadu Legislative Assembly
Living people
Year of birth missing (living people)